Bắc Ninh station is a mainline station of the North–South railway, an important centre of the railways of Vietnam. It serves the city of Bắc Ninh, in Bắc Ninh Province.

The Bắc Ninh railway station, first encountered at the age of seven, is a recurring scene in the autobiography of Marcel Van.

References

Buildings and structures in Bắc Ninh province
Railway stations in Vietnam